Yu Liu (born 15 November 1995) is a Chinese professional golfer and member of the LPGA Tour.

Amateur career
Liu was born in Beijing and had a successful junior career where she won several tournaments in the U.S. and China. She reached the semifinals of the U.S. Girls' Junior Championship in 2011, won by Ariya Jutanugarn.

Liu attended Duke University and played golf with the Duke Blue Devils women's golf team for the 2013–14 season, where she was named Atlantic Coast Conference Rookie of the Year.

Liu secured her first victory in a professional tournament at the 2013 Srixon XXIO Ladies Open on the China LPGA Tour.

Professional career
Liu turned professional in 2014 and joined the Symetra Tour in 2015. In 2017, she was runner-up at the Florida's Natural Charity Classic, Guardian Championship and Symetra Tour Championship. She won the Tullymore Classic to become the third player from China to ever win on the Symetra Tour, joining Yueer Cindy Feng (2014) and Hong Mei Yang (2004). She finished fifth on the money list to earn LPGA Tour membership for 2018.

In her rookie LPGA Tour season, she made 21 cuts in 27 events, to finish 49th on the money list and third in the Rookie of the Year standings. She had three top-10 finishes including a tie for 7th at the 2018 Women's British Open.

In 2019, she finished tied 5th at the 2019 U.S. Women's Open, and was runner-up at the Bank of Hope Founders Cup. She finished 20th on the money list and reached a high of 31st in the Women's World Golf Rankings. 

By 2021, she had pocketed almost $2 million in career earnings.

Amateur wins
2009 CITIC Bank China Amateur Tour Final
2010 CITIC Bank China Amateur Tour Final, Tee Up Junior Challenge, Killington Junior Golf Championship
2011 Under Armour/Vicky Hurst Championship
2012 Chongqing Challenge
2014 Darius Rucker Intercollegiate 

Source:

Professional wins (2)

Symetra Tour (1)

China LPGA Tour wins (1)
2013 Srixon XXIO Ladies Open (as an amateur)

Results in LPGA majors
Results not in chronological order before 2019 or in 2020.

CUT = missed the half-way cut
NT = no tournament
"T" = tied

References

External links

Chinese female golfers
Duke Blue Devils women's golfers
LPGA Tour golfers
Sportspeople from Beijing
1995 births
Living people